Ondřej Roman (born 8 February 1989) is a Czech professional ice hockey forward currently playing for HC Dynamo Pardubice of the Czech Extraliga (ELH). He was a first round selection, 23rd overall by Avtomobilist Yekaterinburg in the 2009 KHL Junior Draft.

Playing career
Roman made his professional debut in the 2005–06 season, in his native Czech Extraliga with his junior club, HC Vítkovice. The following season harbouring NHL ambitions he moved to North America to play major junior hockey in the Western Hockey League with the Spokane Chiefs. After his rookie season, Roman was selected 136th overall in the 2007 NHL Entry Draft by the Dallas Stars.

Roman returned to the Czech Republic for a second stint with his original club, HC Vítkovice. During his second season with the Steelers in 2009–10, on 29 January 2010, Roman was signed by the Dallas Stars to a three-year entry-level contract. Roman reported the next year to the Stars' American Hockey League affiliate, the Texas Stars. In his first professional North American season, Roman appeared in 72 games with Texas, contributing with a career high 22 points.

During the 2011–12 season, unable to gain traction on his debut AHL season, Roman was traded by the Stars to the Florida Panthers in exchange for Angelo Esposito on 13 January 2012. He was immediately assigned to AHL affiliate, the San Antonio Rampage.  Roman finished out the remaining year of his contract with the Panthers by returning again to HC Vítkovice. Marking the end of his NHL aspirations, Roman signed a new contract extension to continue with the Steel on a two-year deal.

With three productive seasons in the Czech Extraliga, Roman signed a two-year contract in the KHL with his draft team, Avtomobilist Yekaterinburg on 13 May 2015.

Career statistics

Regular season and playoffs

International

References

External links

1989 births
Living people
Avtomobilist Yekaterinburg players
Cincinnati Cyclones (ECHL) players
Czech ice hockey left wingers
Dallas Stars draft picks
HC Dynamo Pardubice players
HC Havířov players
Idaho Steelheads (ECHL) players
Ilves players
San Antonio Rampage players
Sportspeople from Ostrava
Spokane Chiefs players
Texas Stars players
HC Vítkovice players
Czech expatriate sportspeople in France
Expatriate ice hockey players in France
Czech expatriate ice hockey players in the United States
Czech expatriate ice hockey players in Russia
Czech expatriate ice hockey players in Finland